Robert Levine may refer to:

 Robert A. Levine, American anthropologist
 Robert M. Levine (1941–2003), American historian
 Robert Levine (artist), American artist and sculptor
 Robert V. Levine (1945–2019), American psychologist

See also
 Robert Levien (1849–1938), Australian politician
 Robert Levin (disambiguation)